Mir Afzal was the caretaker Chief Minister of Gilgit-Baltistan from 24 June to 1 December 2020, and a retired Deputy Inspector General DIG in Gilgit-Baltistan Police. He belongs to Bunji in Astore District, in Gilgit-Baltistan.

References

Year of birth missing (living people)
Living people
Pakistani Muslims
Chief Ministers of Gilgit-Baltistan
Pakistan Muslim League (N) politicians
People from Astore District